James Yeo may refer to:

 James Lucas Yeo (1782–1818), British naval commander who served in the War of 1812
 James Yeo (politician) (1827–1903), merchant, ship builder, ship owner, and Canadian Member of Parliament for Prince Edward Island
 James Yeo (shipbuilder) (1789–1868), Cornish-born shipbuilder, merchant, farmer and political figure in Prince Edward Island